Lesley Marie Rumball  (née Nicol, born 9 May 1973) is a former New Zealand netball player. Rumball played with the New Zealand national netball team, the Silver Ferns, from 1993 to 2005. She represented New Zealand in 109 tests to become the second most capped  player in Silver Ferns history behind Irene van Dyk. Rumball played as a midcourt defender during her top-level netball career, before her retirement in 2006.

Silver Ferns career
Rumball debuted for the national team, the Silver Ferns, in 1993. During her time with the Silver Ferns, she played in three Netball World Championships (1995, 1999, 2003) and two Commonwealth Games (1998, 2002). She was co-captain of the Silver Ferns with Bernice Mene from 1999 to 2001 and 2003 to 2004; she was also vice-captain in 1998, 2002 and 2005.

Domestic netball
Rumball played for the Otago Rebels in the National Bank Cup in 1998, with the Rebels winning the title that season. The following year she changed to Southern Sting in 1999, under coach Robyn Broughton. With the Sting she also won Cup titles every year from 1999 to 2004, and 2nd place in 2005 and 2006. She also became Sting captain in 2003 after Bernice Mene retired from all levels of netball.

Rumball retired from the Silver Ferns in 2005 and the Southern Sting in 2006.

Outside of netball
She married Chris Rumball, who is also a doctor. She and her husband travelled overseas following her retirement from top-level netball, living two years in the United Kingdom followed by a year at the Australian Institute of Sport in Canberra. She subsequently moved back to New Zealand to continue her career in sports medicine through Australasian College of Sport and Exercise Physicians.

In the 2004 New Year Honours Rumball was appointed an Officer of the New Zealand Order of Merit for services to netball.

References

1973 births
Living people
Sportspeople from Invercargill
Officers of the New Zealand Order of Merit
New Zealand netball players
New Zealand international netball players
Netball players at the 1998 Commonwealth Games
Netball players at the 2002 Commonwealth Games
Commonwealth Games silver medallists for New Zealand
Commonwealth Games medallists in netball
New Zealand sports physicians
1995 World Netball Championships players
1999 World Netball Championships players
2003 World Netball Championships players
Southern Sting players
Otago Rebels players
Medallists at the 1998 Commonwealth Games
Medallists at the 2002 Commonwealth Games